Christy Moorehouse (born 1988) is an Irish hurler. At club level he plays with Bray Emmets and is a former member of the Wicklow senior hurling team.

Career

Moorehouse first played hurling at juvenile and underage levels with the Bray Emmets club. He progressed to the club's senior team and has since won seven Wicklow SHC titles. Moorehouse was also captain of the team that won the Leinster ICHC title in 2022.

Moorehouse made his first appearance for the Wicklow senior hurling team in 2007. He was a regular member of the team for much of the following 15 seasons, during which time he won a National League Division 2B title in 2014.

Honours

Bray Emmets
Wicklow Senior Hurling Championship: 2014, 2015, 2016, 2019, 2020, 2021, 2022
Leinster Intermediate Club Hurling Championship: 2022

Wicklow
National League Division 2B: 2014

References

External links
 Christy Moorehouse profile

1988 births
Living people
Bray Emmets hurlers
Wicklow inter-county hurlers